The Sérénade mélancolique in B-flat minor for violin and orchestra, Op. 26 (Russian: Меланхолическая серенада), was written by Pyotr Ilyich Tchaikovsky in February 1875.  It was his first work for violin and orchestra, and was written immediately after completing the Piano Concerto No. 1 in B-flat minor.

Background
The Hungarian violinist Leopold Auer had been professor of violin at the Imperial Conservatory in St Petersburg since 1868.  Tchaikovsky was a professor at the Moscow Conservatory from 1866, and would have known Auer at least by reputation. He had certainly seen him perform in public, having noted "the great expressivity, the thoughtful finesse and poetry of the interpretation" in an 1874 review of Auer's playing. They met no later than January 1875, when both attended a reception at the home of Nikolai Rubinstein.  Tchaikovsky apparently resolved to write a piece for the violinist (one source says Auer commissioned it), and the Sérénade mélancolique was the result.  It was completed quickly by the following month.  The first we know of the work was in Tchaikovsky's letter to his brother Modest of 13/25 February, where he wrote: "I have finished my Piano Concerto, and have already written a violin piece I have promised to Auer".

The piece was dedicated to Auer on its publication by P. Jurgenson in February 1876, but Auer did not premiere it.  It was first performed by Adolph Brodsky on 16/28 January 1876, at the seventh symphony concert of the Russian Musical Society in Moscow.  Auer seems to have been the first to play it in Saint Petersburg, on 6/18 November 1876.

Two years later, Tchaikovsky was offended by Auer's criticisms of, and refusal to perform, the Violin Concerto in D major written for him, and he withdrew that dedication.  The Concerto was premiered by the same Brodsky who had premiered the Sérénade mélancolique.  At that time, Tchaikovsky chose also to withdraw the dedication to Auer of the Sérénade, although it was impossible to remove his name from the edition then being printed by Jurgenson.

Key
An examination of the score of the Sérénade mélancolique shows it is clearly written in the key of B-flat minor, although a number of sources describe it as being in B minor,  This confusion may have come about because the note the English-speaking world calls B-flat is known in German musical nomenclature as B, while our note B (natural) is known in Germany as H.

Influences
The music was influenced by compositions Tchaikovsky had been working on.  Its first sounds are taken from Oxana's challenge to Vakula in Act II, Scene 2 of Vakula the Smith/Cherevichki.  A melody in the central section mirrors the French melody in the slow movement of the Piano Concerto No. 1, which was also written in B-flat minor, and had been completed less than two months earlier.

Instrumentation
The piece is originally orchestrated for solo violin, pairs of flutes, oboes, clarinets in B-flat and bassoons, four horns in F and the usual strings.
Furthermore, there are various arrangements for violin and piano, including the composer's own arrangement.

Recordings
The Sérénade mélancolique has been recorded many times.

References

External links
 Tchaikovsky Research: Sérénade mélancolique
 Tchaikovsky Research: Leopold Auer
 Pyotr.Tchaikovsky.com
 Classical Archives

Compositions by Pyotr Ilyich Tchaikovsky
Compositions for violin and orchestra
Tchaikovsky
1875 compositions
Compositions in B-flat minor
Music with dedications